Norman Palmer (October 7, 1918 – March 23, 2013) was an American television editor for The Walt Disney Company. Palmer worked for Disney for around 45 years and served as a mentor to Roy E. Disney, who was later appointed vice-chairman of Disney productions.

Palmer was born and raised in California and graduated from Hollywood High School in 1937. He joined the editorial division of Disney in 1940. Palmer edited films including The Living Desert, The African Lion, Water Birds, The Shaggy D.A., and The Legend of Lobo.

He died on March 23, 2013, of natural causes. He is also believed to be the inspiration for the fictional character Norman Polk, a projectionist created by game developer theMeatly for his best selling video-game "Bendy And The Ink Machine", released on the 10 February 2017.

References

External links

1918 births
2013 deaths
Disney people
American film editors